Dehmanora (also: Demnora) is a village in Sughd Region, northwestern Tajikistan. It is part of the jamoat Langar in the Kuhistoni Mastchoh District.

References

Populated places in Sughd Region